DJ Hollywood (born Anthony Holloway; December 10, 1954) is an American MC and disc jockey.

Background 
According to Kurtis Blow and Pete DJ Jones, Hollywood was the first rapper in the hip-hop style, making him the "Father" of the Hip Hop style. Before Hollywood introduced "Hip Hop style" rapping, he had already impacted DJing by creating a set that included singing, rhyming, and call and response, where he interacted with the crowd. An example would be Hollywood saying, "If you're feeling good with Hollywood somebody say, Oh yeah!" And the crowd would shout back: "Oh yeah!" Other rappers have been using some of his creations for the last 30 years, such as "throw ya hands in the air and wave 'em like you just don't care."

Holloway said, "Don't get me wrong, they had people [who] rapped before me syncopated and unsyncopated. I cannot take nothing away from people like Oscar Brown Jr., Pigmeat Markham, the Last Poets, Gil Scott Heron, the Watts Prophets, Rudy Ray Moore, I used to listen to all of them. I cannot take nothing from none of them ... but none of them was doing what I was doing with the turntables and a mic."

Hollywood's renown spread rapidly and he became a regular at the Apollo, even having his name added to the marquee. Hollywood had been DJing since 1972, and like every MC, he "rhythm talked". And like radio DJs, he usually pattered sequences of one or two bar rhymes. Hollywood said, he used to like the way "Frankie Crocker would ride a track, but he wasn't syncopated to the track though. I liked WWRL DJ Hank Spann too, but he wasn't on the one. Guys back then weren't concerned with being musical. I wanted to flow with the record."

In 1975, Hollywood would make his greatest contribution, when he adapted the lyrics of Isaac Hayes's "Good Love 6-9969" to the breakdown part of MFSB's "Love is the Message", which made Hollywood into an instant sensation. Hollywood did something new; he rhymed syncopated to the beat of an existing record uninterruptedly for nearly a minute. In effect, he connected the various short MC rhymes/patters into one continuous rhyme, introducing "flow" and giving birth to what would become known as the "hip hop" style. Before then, all MCs rhymed based on radio DJs. This usually consisted of short patters that were disconnected thematically. But by using song lyrics, Hollywood had imparted an inherent flow and theme to his rhyme. This was the game changer.

In 1978 and 1979, DJ Hollywood was the first DJ to bring turntables and a mixer to perform at the Apollo Theater. Before long, club owners in the South Bronx had hired Hollywood to play at a spot called Club 371. Kevin Smith, better known as Lovebug Starski, is considered one of the first hip-hop style rappers. Starski, however, was Hollywood's partner and simply imitated this new style.

Most of DJ Hollywood’s body of musical work was live, not recorded, although he did release a single "Shock Shock The House" in 1980 on CBS Records. Until the mid-1980s, Hollywood was one of the top DJs. He retired from the business and struggled with drug addiction. He has since returned to performing in the New York City area, appearing with Tha Veteranz which reunited him with his former partner Lovebug Starski.

References

Further reading

External links

1954 births
Living people
American hip hop DJs
African-American rappers
21st-century American rappers
21st-century African-American musicians
20th-century African-American people